Cadena is a surname.

Cadena or variation, may also refer to:

La Cadena, a mountain in the Province of Málaga in southern Spain
Estero La Cadena, a river in Chile
Cadena (comics), a Marvel Comics character
Cadena 94.9 (Spanish: 94.9 Network), an Argentine radio station broadcasting from the city of Pilar, Buenos Aires
Cadena Cafes Limited, a chain of cafes in southern England from the 1890s to the 1970s
Grupo Cadena, a media company based in Tijuana, Baja California, Mexico
Cadena COPE, a private, right wing, commercial Spanish radio network owned by a series of institutions within the Spanish Catholic Church
Cadena Dial, a Spanish radio station based in Seville
Cadena Melodía, a Colombian radio network, founded in 1971 by liberal politician Efraín Páez Espitia
Cadena SER (the SER Network), Spain's premier radio network in terms of both seniority
Cadena Súper, a Colombian radio network, founded in the 1970s by Conservative politician Jaime Pava Navarro
Cadena temporal and cadena perpetua, punishments in the Philippine legal system

See also

Cadena braga, an American telenovela created and produced by Telemundo 1991
Cadena Capriles, a Venezuelan media company that owns the newspapers Últimas Noticias and El Mundo
Cadena Salsoul, an entertainment-based salsa radio station in Puerto Rico
 
Lacadena (disambiguation)